The 2022–23 St. Thomas (Minnesota) Tommies men's ice hockey season was the 99th season of play for the program, the 2nd in Division I and the 2nd in the CCHA conference. The Tommies represented the University of St. Thomas (Minnesota) and were coached by Enrico Blasi, in his second season.

Season
After a predictably terrible season, the first for the program at the Division I level, coach Blasi continued his task of turning the Tommies into a competitive team. With more than half of the team being new, there were sure to be changes but the roster turnover meant that getting the team to gel together would take time. The offense, which had been one of the worst in the nation in 2022, didn't see much improvement early in the season. In the first 14 games, the Tommies scored more than two goals in just four matches. Averaging just over two goals per game, the team got off to an ugly start (2–12). While their record was awful, the team did show improvement on the defensive end. St. Thomas was allowing far fewer shots and goals against and half of their losses were by only one goal.

Just after Thanksgiving, the Tommies posted their first weekend sweep at the D-I level. Using the milestone as a benchmark, St. Thomas saw a vast improvement to their performance over the remainder of the season. A modest increase in both offensive production and defensive efficiency enabled the team to post a .500 record over their final 18 games. While the Tommies couldn't string together anything resembling a winning streak, they also never lost more than two in a row during that stretch. St. Thomas was also able to post its first two wins over ranked teams, defeating both Michigan Tech and Minnesota State on the road. Though they couldn't improve on their conference position much due to the team's poor start, the wins piled up to the point where the Tommies had a respectable total by the end of the year.

St. Thomas finished the season as the 7th seed in the CCHA tournament and, though they weren't predicted to win, they still outperformed expectations. The Tommies pushed Tech to the limit in both games, ultimately falling short by a single goal in both.

While the team did finish the season 12 games under .500, the program had come a long way over the course of the season. Not only did they nearly quadruple the win total from 2022, but they increased their goal production by 27 while cutting down on the goals allowed by 51. Even with a losing record, the program could still chalk this season up as a success.

Departures

Recruiting

Roster
As of July 21, 2022.

Standings

Schedule and results

|-
!colspan=12 style=";" | Regular Season

|-
!colspan=12 style=";" |

Scoring statistics

Goaltending statistics

Rankings

Note: USCHO did not release a poll in weeks 1, 13, or 26.

References

2022-23
St. Thomas (Minnesota) Tommies
St. Thomas (Minnesota) Tommies
2023 in sports in Minnesota
2022 in sports in Minnesota